The Bararati River is a river in the state of Amazonas, Brazil. It is a left tributary of the Juruena River.

Course

The Bararati River flows from south to north through the Sucunduri State Park, a  conservation unit created in 2005.

See also
List of rivers of Amazonas (Brazilian state)

References

Sources

Rivers of Amazonas (Brazilian state)